The Yearning may refer to:

Albums
The Yearning (Things of Stone and Wood album), 1993
The Yearning (Aisles album), 2005

See also
 Yearning (disambiguation)